Cincinnati has several modes of transportation including sidewalks, roads, public transit, bicycle paths and regional and international airports. Most trips are made by car, with transit and bicycles having a relatively low share of total trips; in a region of just over 2 million people, less than 80,000 trips are made with transit on an average day. The city is sliced by three major interstate highways, I-71, I-74 and I-75, and circled by a beltway several miles out from the city limits. The region is served by two separate transit systems, one on each side of the river. SORTA, on the Ohio side is about 6 times larger than TANK on the Kentucky side. The transit system is largely radial with almost all lines terminating in or departing from Downtown Cincinnati. The city's hills preclude the regular street grid common to many cities built up in the 19th century, and outside of the downtown basin, regular street grids are rare except for in patches of flat land where they're small and oriented according to topography.

Bicycles
Cincinnati Red Bike, a public bicycle sharing system, opened in the fall of 2014. The University of Cincinnati has operated a small bike-share program for several years.

Public transportation

Buses
Cincinnati is served by buses run by the Southwest Ohio Regional Transit Authority (SORTA), the Transit Authority of Northern Kentucky (TANK) and the Clermont Transportation Connection.

Almost all transit lines, including those of TANK are centered on Downtown Cincinnati. This has led many people to criticize the system for being overly radial and reliant on transfers in Downtown. Several lines in Ohio, generally those ending in '1'(31, 51, 41) don't go downtown at all but provide a link between the radial arms created by the other lines.

SORTA is significantly larger than TANK, operating more lines, at higher frequencies, and carrying about six times as many passengers on an average day.

Most of SORTA's funding comes from the City of Cincinnati, and so the most intensive transit service is confined to the city boundaries. Outside of the city is considered Zone 2, and a higher fare is charged. The Clermont Transportation Connection and Warren County Transit partially fund SORTA routes that extend into Clermont County and Warren County, respectively. SORTA's paratransit services are partially subsidized by Hamilton County. TANK is funded by Campbell and Kenton counties.

SORTA and TANK primarily operate 40 foot diesel buses, though some lines are served by longer articulated or hybrid engine buses. Paratransit services generally make use of minibuses.

Streetcars

A single streetcar line, the Cincinnati Bell Connector, runs between The Banks, Downtown, and Findlay Market in Over-the-Rhine in a  loop. It opened in 2016. Future extensions have been proposed to the Uptown area, home to the University of Cincinnati, the regional hospitals, and the Cincinnati Zoo; and to Northern Kentucky.

Streetcars were the main form of transportation in the city. The first electric streetcars began operation in 1889, and at its maximum, the streetcar system had  of track and carried more than 100 million passengers per year. With the advent of inexpensive automobiles and improved roads, transit ridership declined in the 20th century and the streetcar system closed in 1951.

Public steps
The Steps of Cincinnati are a historic mode of transportation in the hilly city. In addition to practical use linking hillside neighborhoods, the approximately 400 stairways are often used for exercise.

Intercity transportation

Amtrak's Cardinal train travels to Chicago and Indianapolis to the northwest and to Washington, D.C., Philadelphia and New York City to the east. It goes in each direction three times each week and arrives in Cincinnati between 1 and 3:30am. Its ticket office and station are at Cincinnati Union Terminal.

Greyhound operates a 24-hour bus terminal (formerly in Downtown Cincinnati, now in Arlington Heights) with trips to all major nearby cities and connections to the rest of the country. Regional carriers GO Bus and Barron's Bus also serve the terminal. For the last couple of years, Megabus has also operated several trips a week between Cincinnati and a few major cities in the midwest. Chinatown bus lines connect Cincinnati with New York City.

Abandoned subway

Cincinnati has an incomplete subway system. Construction stopped in 1924 when unexpected post-World War I inflation doubled the cost of construction and the funds originally set aside weren't enough to complete the project. There have been several attempts in recent decades by the SORTA to use the subway tunnels for a light rail system, but ballot initiatives to generate funds for such projects have so far all failed. The most recent attempt was the 2002 MetroMoves plan which would have generated $2.7 billion for a comprehensive transit plan, but it failed by a 2–1 margin. Today the subway is used as a conduit for fiber optic and water lines. It's sealed off from the public, but is occasionally home to urban explorers and the homeless.

Bridges

The city has a river ferry and many bridges. The Anderson Ferry has been in continuous operation since 1817.
Cincinnati's major bridges include:
 The Newport Southbank Bridge (a.k.a. the Purple People Bridge because of its status as a pedestrian-only bridge as well as its color)
 The John A. Roebling Suspension Bridge Opened in 1866, this bridge was the prototype for the Brooklyn Bridge, also designed by Roebling.
 The Daniel Carter Beard Bridge (a.k.a. the Big Mac bridge for its yellow arches, reminiscent of the McDonald's logo) carries I-471 and connects Cincinnati with Newport, Kentucky
 The Brent Spence Bridge A double-decker truss bridge carrying I-71/75 connecting Cincinnati with Covington, Kentucky
 The Clay Wade Bailey Bridge
 The Taylor-Southgate Bridge
 The Combs-Hehl Bridge a twin-span truss, part of the I-275 loop and commonly called "The 275 Bridge", it travels through Fort Thomas, Kentucky and connects to the neighborhood of California, the easternmost neighborhood in the city limits.

Airports
Cincinnati/Northern Kentucky International Airport (IATA: CVG) is the major international airport serving the metropolitan area and is located across the river in Hebron, Kentucky. CVG stands for Covington, the nearest and largest city by the airport when it was built. Although CVG serves Cincinnati, many people do not know it is actually located in Kentucky. The airport is focus city for Allegiant Air. The airport also serves as a global cargo super-hub for DHL Express, and is the 40th busiest airport in the world with cargo operations included. The city has three other airports; Lunken Airport, a municipal airfield used for smaller business jets and private planes; the Butler County Regional Airport, located between Fairfield and Hamilton, which ranks just behind Lunken in business jets and has the largest private aircraft capacity of the Cincinnati area; Cincinnati West Airport, a smaller airport located in Harrison, Ohio.

Combined, they anchor the corners of a triangular region that serves about 50% of the population of Ohio and about 10% of Kentucky.

Highways

Interstates 71, 74, and 75 are major routes connecting Cincinnati to Louisville and Lexington in Kentucky; Indianapolis; and Dayton and Columbus in Ohio. The metropolitan area is encircled by an outer-belt, Interstate 275, the longest loop highway in the country. Interstate 471 connects a portion of Northern Kentucky to downtown Cincinnati.

Cincinnati is also served by numerous U.S. highways: US 22, US 25, US 27, US 42, US 50, US 52, and US 127.

Prominent freeways include Mill Creek Expressway (Interstate 75), Fort Washington Way (Interstate 71), the Ronald Reagan Cross County Highway, the Norwood Lateral Expressway, Columbia Parkway, and the Sixth Street Expressway. The Appalachian Highway extends east from Cincinnati across southern Ohio to West Virginia.

The downtown area features a system of viaducts with names such as Western Hills, Ida, and formerly Waldvogel.

Commerce
According to Forbes Magazine, Cincinnatians spend 20% of their income on transit, which makes the city the sixth most expensive city for commuting in the United States. , the port of Cincinnati is ranked 5th by trip ton-miles for an inland port.

Several freight railroads service Cincinnati, the largest being CSX Transportation which operates a railroad yard west of Interstate 75. Other railroads include Norfolk Southern, which operates a large intermodal yard in the west end neighborhood of Queensgate and the Indiana & Ohio Railroad which operates several small predecessor yards throughout the city.

See also
Miami and Erie Canal

References

 
Cincinnati, Ohio